is a Japanese anime television series produced by Production I.G, about a group of people who can control the wind. The series premiered from September 11, 2004 to February 26, 2005 across Japan on the anime television network, Animax, which also later aired the series across its respective networks worldwide, including East Asia, Southeast Asia, and other regions. Sentai Filmworks licensed the series and released it with English subtitles in July 2015.

It is distinguished from other Production I.G series because of its draft-like animation style mixed with 3D elements.

Characters
 Nao Ueshima

 Nao is the president of the two person Digital Camera Club, and the second student at the school to discover the wind users. She discovers the Wind Cat on the school roof and while taking its picture it flies away into the sky with a swarm of other cats. Nao falls off the roof but lands safely and proceeds to search out the cause. She discovers Ryouko and the Wind Cat and sets out to discover the secrets of the Wind users.

 Ryouko Yoshino

 Ryouko was the first student to discover the wind users, and has a crush on Taiki. Taiki taught her how to use the wind and she claims that he also taught the Wind Cat, who may have taught the other cats.

 Mr. Taiki

 A math teacher at the school and a Wind user from the Wind village. He is at first reluctant to teach the children how to manipulate the wind, but after they learn from other sources he provides insight and help on occasion.

 Miki Kataoka

 Miki is the only other member of the digital camera club. She is Nao's friend, and aids her in her photography but doesn't seem interested in photography herself. Along with Jun and Nao she learns of the wind users and learns the secrets of wind manipulation. She has had a crush on Jun for a while, and they eventually end up dating.

 Jun Nomura

 After mistakenly telling everyone that he saw Nao try to kill herself he apologizes profusely and ends up following her and Miki around to make it up to her. He also learns about wind manipulation and joins Miki and Nao in learning about the wind and sharing in their explorations.

 Yukio

 Yukio is a woman that lives in the village of wind users. She is the widow of Taiki's brother and has an ambiguous relationship with him.

 The Wind Cat
 A cat that Taiki taught how to manipulate the wind. He likes to sleep on the school roof, and play in the winds. Ryouko feeds him and looks out for him.

Music
Opening Theme: Kaze no Shi ~windy Tales~, performed by CHARA
Ending Theme: Yuuhi no Iro Dake, performed by Windy-S
Background Music: Kawai Kenji

Episode list

References

External links
Official Japanese website
Windy Tales at Production I.G.
Anime News Network Review

2004 anime television series debuts
Drama anime and manga
Production I.G
Sentai Filmworks
Anime with original screenplays